Matheus Celestino Moresche Rodrigues (born 24 June 1998), commonly known as Moresche, is a Brazilian footballer who plays for Central Coast Mariners in the Australian football competition Isuzu Ute A-League Men.

Club career

Geylang International 
Moresche signed for Singapore Premier League side Geylang International for the 2021 Singapore Premier League season after leaving Riga FC at the start of this year. He made his Geylang debut in the first match of the season after coming on in the 12th minute to replace Barry Maguire who had pulled up clutching his hamstring during an Eagles' counter-attack. Moresche scored a brace on his debut, helping his team to a 2-1 victory over Tanjong Pagar United.

Central Coast Mariners FC 
On 30 October 2021, Central Coast Mariners FC signed Moresche for the 2021–22 A-League season. He made his debut for the Mariners as a substitute in a win over Blacktown City in the 2021 FFA Cup on 13 November 2021.

On 7 May 2022, Moresche tore his anterior cruciate ligament in an F3 Derby against Newcastle Jets. After a  9 month recovery, Moresche made his return to senior football for the Mariners on 18 February 2023, coming off the bench against Perth Glory at Macedonia Park.

International career 
Moresche represented Brazil at youth international level.

Career statistics

Club

Notes

References

External links
 

1998 births
Living people
Brazilian footballers
Brazilian expatriate footballers
Association football forwards
Campeonato Brasileiro Série A players
Belarusian Premier League players
A-League Men players
Botafogo de Futebol e Regatas players
Sport Club Corinthians Paulista players
CR Vasco da Gama players
Avaí FC players
Riga FC players
FC Torpedo-BelAZ Zhodino players
Geylang International FC players
Central Coast Mariners FC players
Brazilian expatriate sportspeople in Latvia
Expatriate footballers in Latvia
Brazilian expatriate sportspeople in Belarus
Expatriate footballers in Belarus
Expatriate footballers in Singapore
Expatriate soccer players in Australia
Footballers from Rio de Janeiro (city)